McMurray is a census-designated place (CDP) in Peters Township, Washington County, Pennsylvania. The population was 4,736 at the 2020 census. It is part of the Pittsburgh metropolitan area. Its zip code is 15317, which it shares with neighboring borough Canonsburg.

History
McMurray was named after several farmers, including Levi McMurray, who owned and farmed the land in what is today known as McMurray. The area is part of the municipality of Peters Township.

Geography
McMurray is located at  (40.282276, -80.087162).

Demographics

As of the census of 2000, there were 4,726 people, 1,582 households, and 1,387 families living in the CDP. The population density was 1,533.5 people per square mile (592.4/km2). There were 1,612 housing units at an average density of 523.1/sq mi (202.1/km2). The racial makeup of the CDP was 97.97% White, 0.55% African American, 0.02% Native American, 0.97% Asian, 0.15% from other races, and 0.34% from two or more races. Hispanic or Latino of any race were 0.72% of the population.

Ancestries of CDP residents include Italian (28.7%), German (28.4%), Irish (24.3%), English (12.0%), Polish (9.4%), and Slovak (4.4%).

There were 1,582 households, out of which 43.7% had children under the age of 18 living with them, 82.1% were married couples living together, 4.7% had a female householder with no husband present, and 12.3% were non-families. 11.2% of all households were made up of individuals, and 6.0% had someone living alone who was 65 years of age or older. The average household size was 2.96 and the average family size was 3.21.

In the CDP the population was spread out, with 31.0% under the age of 18, 3.7% from 18 to 24, 24.9% from 25 to 44, 29.2% from 45 to 64, and 11.3% who were 65 years of age or older. The median age was 40 years. For every 100 females age 18 and over, there were 92.4 males.

The median income for a household in the CDP was $81,736, and the median income for a family was $86,711. Males had a median income of $67,317 versus $41,467 for females. The per capita income for the CDP was $37,364. 0.7% of the population and 0.6% of families were below the poverty line. The median house value in the year 2000 was $187,100.

References

Census-designated places in Washington County, Pennsylvania